Coordinadora Arauco-Malleco (CAM) is a radical, militant indigenous organization engaged in political violence in pursuit of attaining an autonomous Mapuche state in the territory they describe as Wallmapu.

Founded in 1998 in Tranaquepe, Chile, CAM arose from the revitalization of the Mapuche conflict that decade, motivated by the extreme poverty and discrimination their ethnic group had to undergo for over a century, ever since the Occupation of Araucanía. CAM considers their own actions to be but fair self-defence amidst a struggle of national liberation, and their politics combine Mapuche traditions, Western political thought and knowledge acquired through experience.

CAM is responsible for several land occupations in the zones of Tirúa, Contulmo, Cañete and Temucuicui, and is known for resorting to arson against logging trucks and rural estates operating or located within the territories they claim as their own. Although occasionally such attacks have affected civilians, they aim to damage the property of those who "have usurped their homeland". Most of their actions are carried out on the sly, but sometimes they have resulted in confrontations with the "Fuerzas Especiales" of Carabineros de Chile. CAM has also backed minor Mapuche communities in taking direct action against forest companies and landowners who exploit the region, by lending them paramilitary support – a way of exerting political pressure.

On May 31, 2022, the Chamber of Deputies of Chile, with 66 votes in favor, 43 against and 13 abstentions, approved a resolution requesting the Chilean government to declare the CAM as an "illegal terrorist organization".

History

Background 
The land rights claimed by Coordinadora Arauco-Malleco and their efforts to assert them can be traced to long-standing friction between the Mapuche and successive external armed forces in the restive Araucanía region.

The Mapuche have long resisted occupation by other armies beginning first with the Inca and then followed by the very earliest Spanish incursions into Mapuche territory in the 16th century and the breach of an accepted line of demarcation between the Spanish domains and the land of the independent Mapuche following the Battle of Curalaba. During the subsequent destruction of the Seven Cities, Mapuche warriors were responsible for razing seven significant Spanish outposts in southern Chile alongside Huilliche forces, a forerunner of the contemporary campaign against the key commercial infrastructure of forestry companies and sheep stations in the region of Araucanía.

A decade-long period of warfare from 1655 between the Spanish and the Mapuche as well as yet more incursions during the occupation of Araucanía in the 1870s and 1880s, a period when many Chileans acquired lands in Araucanía, are arguably also at the core of the guerrillas' grievances. Before the occupation, the Mapuche-ruled area of Araucanía had been recognised as an autonomous region by the Spanish and then independent Chilean authorities. CAM's re-occupation of territory in Tirúa, Contulmo, and elsewhere represents an attempt at returning to the pre-1870s status quo.

Recent history 
In 1996, some Mapuche communities formed the Lafkenche Territorial Coordinator. In 1998, the conflict of Traiguén arose followed by the later realization of a meeting of communities and a Guillatún. In this meeting the communities in conflict of Arauco and Lumaco participated, the Mapuche Coordinator of Santiago and the Mapuche Organization Meli Wixan Mapu of Santiago. Leaders from communities of Collipulli also joined. During this meeting, the idea of a new meeting in Tranaquepe was raised, only with the Mapuche communities in conflict. In a moment of the meeting, the idea of forming the Coordinadora that they named "Mapuche Coordinator of Communities in Conflict Arauco Malleco" arose. 

The first attack perpetrated by the group was the 1st of December 1997, when in the area of Lumaco, three trucks belonging to the company Forestal Arauco were intercepted by community members who would later be known as members of the CAM.This action created a new subjectivity in the Mapuche militancy, modifying its way of doing politics, detonating in a conflict against the security forces. 

According to historian Jorge Pinto Rodríguez, the organization is the entity that up to 2017 has led the most violent mobilization of Mapuche people: "It has claimed the figure of the warrior or weichafe -in Mapudungun-," he said. Beyond a specific event, Pinto indicated that the beginnings of this organization are associated with a "lack of response from the State in response to the demands made to mitigate the effects of forestry, mining and hydroelectric projects in La Araucanía or Wallmapu ("ancestral territory" in mapudungún), he explained. "They are opposed to a state that they call colonialist and capitalist, and emerge from a stage, at the end of the nineties, of indigenous protests throughout the continent, they take the flag in Chile," said Pinto.

Attacks

2009 actions and controversy 
On the morning of August 12 of 2009, it is alleged by Chilean officials that about 80 Mapuches entered the country estate "San Sebastián", located between Collipulli and Angol, and occupied it. The occupation was made in response to their unanswered request to buy the San Sebastián estate by authorities. Sergio González Jarpa, agriculture businessman and owner of the estate, requested to the court of Angol the ouster of the occupants. Carabineros gathered special forces from Araucanía Region and flew in a GOPE unit from Santiago. The ouster begun at around 14.00. As result one young Mapuche Jaime Mendoza Collio was shot dead and one carabinero was injured in the leg. The leader of Mapuche organization Consejo de Todas las Tierras Aucán Huilcamán strongly condemned the actions of the police and called the killing an extrajudicial execution. Later on the Legal Medical Service of Chile stated that the dead Mapuche had been shot from behind in the back. Investigations by Policía de Investigaciones have shown that the Mapuche who was shot, Jaime Mendoza Collío, did not have remains of gunpowder on his hands as Carabineros had suggested.  

The attacks of 2009 again brought the CAM issue to the level of government. The Alianza por Chile claimed that the Concertación governments have not done enough to arrest the authors of the attacks and protect private property. On August 19, Chilean President Michelle Bachelet condemned an incident between minister Edmundo Pérez Yoma (DC) and the opposition deputy Gonzalo Arenas (UDI), where Arenas threw an alleged copy of the pardon of former CAM leader Víctor Ancalaf on Pérez Yoma's face. Victor Ancalaf had served 5 years of a 10-year prison sentence for terrorist crimes, which Ancalaf vehemently denies.

Murder of Werner Luchsinger and Vivianne Mackay 
The gravest case to which CAM has been linked to is the murder of Werner Luchsinger and Vivianne Mackay, a couple of wealthy farmers who died in an arson fire in their country house located in Vilcún, in 2013. After being found by the police that night – bullet-wounded and less than a mile away from the Luchsinger's farm – machi Celestino Córdova was held responsible for the attack and later judged and condemned for the crimes. He is still serving the sentence and is the only person to have ever been formally charged for the death of the Luchsingers. CAM claims that he is innocent and was used as a scapegoat, and therefore considers him to be a political prisoner.

International contacts
Latest evidence, such as their leaders being invited into Caracas and Colombian authorities investigations, has established links between the organization, the government of president Nicolás Maduro in Venezuela, and the FARC guerrillas.

See also 

Weichán Auka Mapu
Resistencia Ancestral Mapuche
Wallmapuwen
KLFA

References

1998 establishments in Chile
Mapuche
Guerrilla movements in Latin America
Indigenous organisations in Chile
Indigenous rights organizations in South America
Liberation theology
Left-wing militant groups
Mapuche conflict
Mapuche organizations
Rebel groups in Chile